Wall Township is a township in Monmouth County, in the U.S. state of New Jersey. Situated within the heart of the Jersey Shore region in the New York Metropolitan Area, the township is a bedroom suburb of New York City. As of the 2020 United States census, the township's population was 26,525, an increase of 361 (+1.4%) from the 2010 census count of 26,164, which in turn reflected an increase of 903 (+3.6%) from the 25,261 counted in the 2000 census.

Wall Township was formally incorporated as a township by an act of the New Jersey Legislature on March 7, 1851. Over the years, portions of the township have been taken to form North Spring Lake (May 1884), Ocean Beach (March 9, 1885, now Belmar), Manasquan (December 30, 1887), Spring Lake (March 14, 1892), Sea Girt (March 29, 1917), Brielle (April 10, 1919), South Belmar (March 12, 1924, now Lake Como) and Spring Lake Heights (March 19, 1927).

Wall Township was named for General Garret D. Wall (1783–1850), a lawyer who commanded a Trenton volunteer company during the War of 1812 and was stationed at Sandy Hook. Wall served five years as clerk of the New Jersey Supreme Court and as quartermaster general of the state for more than 20 years before being chosen to represent the state in the United States Senate from 1835 to 1841.

History
The Greenville Cemetery was established in 1734, when a casualty of the French and Indian War was buried there. The original structure of the Glendola Protestant Bible Church was built in 1776; The congregation dedicated a new church in 1964.

Allaire Village dates back to 1822, when James P. Allaire purchased what became known as the Howell Works in Wall, and though it was the largest producing bog iron manufacturing site in New Jersey by 1836, the ironworks were shut down in 1846. The village and surrounding acres were later preserved and gifted to the State of New Jersey to form Allaire State Park as a memorial to Hearst editor Arthur Brisbane, the last private owner of the site, who purchased the land in 1907 and built a palatial residence on that property that would later serve as the Arthur Brisbane Child Treatment Center. The Brisbane family donated the property to the State of New Jersey to establish Allaire State Park and the Historic Village at Allaire. Allaire Village Inc., a non-profit organization, is licensed by the State of New Jersey to operate the site now known as "The Historic Village at Allaire."

The Allgor-Barkalow Homestead at 1701 New Bedford Road was constructed in 1840, although some accounts indicate construction of part of the building began in the 18th century. The building now houses the museum of the Old Wall Historical Society. The Blansingburg schoolhouse at Sea Girt Avenue opened in 1855; The building was relocated in 1999 to the Allgor-Barkalow Homestead Museum property for refurbishing.

Wall Township was formed in 1851, from portions of Howell Township.

The newly formed Marconi Wireless Telegraph Company of America, with its home office in England, purchases a  farm around 1900 that became the site of the company's receiver equipment for commercial transatlantic radio operation. The Marconi signal site was abandoned in 1924, but it was later occupied by the Ku Klux Klan until they were ejected in March 1928. The United States Army purchased the Marconi site in November 1941 and named it Camp Evans.

The Allenwood Hospital, located at the corner of Squankum-Allenwood and Hospital Roads, opened in January 1921 as a sanatorium for tuberculosis patients. In 1957, a 16-room building is dedicated to Geraldine L. Thompson, who served as president of the hospital's board of managers. In the 1960s, the facility becomes an annex to the John L. Montgomery Medical Home in Freehold Township, a county-run nursing home, and was renamed the Geraldine L. Thompson Care Center. In early 2016, Monmouth County finalized the sale of the nursing home to Preferred Care Holdings LLC for $15 million, which was renamed Preferred Care at Wall.

In 1940, Edward I. Brown used an old World War I tank converted into a bulldozer to clear land for an airport that he turned into what is now Monmouth Executive Airport after completing his service in the United States Navy as a pilot during World War II; The airport was sold by the Brown family in 2007 to a private equity firm, despite lengthy attempts by Monmouth County to acquire the facility.

Wall Stadium, which opened in 1950, is located just south of Monmouth Executive Airport and north of Interstate 195 on Route 34 and was the first track that NASCAR champion Richard Petty raced on in the United States. In 2019, plans were announced to close the track after the 2020 season and construct houses on the site.
 
The Roadside Diner, formerly the Circle Diner and Rusty's, was delivered to its Route 34 site by the Silk City Diner Co. in the 1940s. The diner was used for filming of a scene for the 1983 movie Baby It's You and appears on the cover of the 1994 Bon Jovi album Cross Road: 14 Classic Grooves, as well as having been featured in the 2008 music video for "Girls in Their Summer Clothes" by Bruce Springsteen.

Wall High School opened in September 1959, while Wall Intermediate School opened in 1967.

Interstate 195 was extended into Wall Township in 1981, giving direct high-speed access to Trenton.

A suit filed by the American Civil Liberties Union in December 1999 against the township over a holiday display that included a nativity scene and a Hannukah menorah, contending that the religious symbols violate the constitutional separation of church and state, was dismissed by a judge who ruled that the organization had filed its suit too close to the start of the holiday season. The United States Court of Appeals for the Third Circuit issued a ruling in April 2001 vacating the decision of the district court in the case that the township's holiday display as modified in 2000 to include other seasonal decorations did not violate the Establishment Clause or the New Jersey Constitution and ruling that the ACLU lacked standing to file the case.

Even though many of the surrounding municipalities sprung out of Wall Township, the only ZIP code that exclusively serves areas of Wall is Allenwood, but even it relies solely on a Post-office box system for regular mail services.

Geography
According to the United States Census Bureau, the township had a total area of 31.69 square miles (82.08 km2), including 30.66 square miles (79.41 km2) of land and 1.03 square miles (2.67 km2) of water (3.25%).

Allenwood (2010 Census population of 925) and West Belmar (2010 population 2,493) are census-designated places and unincorporated communities located within Wall Township.

Other unincorporated communities, localities and place names located partially or completely within the township include Algers Mills, Allaire, Baileys Corner, Blansingburg, Carmerville, Collingwood Park, Glendola, Hurleys Mills, Lake Como, New Bedford, Old Mill, Osborn Island, Osbornes Mills, Remsen Mills, Shark River, Sterling Woods, Treasure Island and Wallington.

Wreck Pond is a tidal pond located on the coast of the Atlantic Ocean, surrounded by Wall Township and the boroughs of Spring Lake, Spring Lake Heights, and Sea Girt.

The township borders the municipalities of Belmar, Brielle, Colts Neck Township, Howell Township, Lake Como, Manasquan, Neptune Township, Sea Girt, Spring Lake, Spring Lake Heights and Tinton Falls in Monmouth County; and Brick Township in Ocean County.

In 2005, the Township de-annexed its southernmost portion in favor of Howell Township.

Demographics

2010 census

The Census Bureau's 2006–2010 American Community Survey showed that (in 2010 inflation-adjusted dollars) median household income was $89,278 (with a margin of error of +/− $6,640) and the median family income was $108,865 (+/− $6,748). Males had a median income of $75,198 (+/− $3,706) versus $51,969 (+/− $5,806) for females. The per capita income for the borough was $46,514 (+/− $2,483). About 3.1% of families and 4.1% of the population were below the poverty line, including 4.7% of those under age 18 and 4.5% of those age 65 or over.

2000 census
As of the 2000 United States census there were 25,261 people, 9,437 households, and 6,926 families residing in the township.  The population density was 825.1 people per square mile (318.5/km2).  There were 9,957 housing units at an average density of 325.2 per square mile (125.6/km2).  The racial makeup of the township was 97.09% White, 0.61% African American, 0.10% Native American, 1.26% Asian, 0.04% Pacific Islander, 0.32% from other races, and 0.58% from two or more races. Hispanic or Latino of any race were 1.55% of the population.

There were 9,437 households, out of which 33.8% had children under the age of 18 living with them, 63.0% were married couples living together, 8.0% had a female householder with no husband present, and 26.6% were non-families. 22.7% of all households were made up of individuals, and 9.7% had someone living alone who was 65 years of age or older.  The average household size was 2.64 and the average family size was 3.14.

In the township the population was spread out, with 25.2% under the age of 18, 5.1% from 18 to 24, 28.4% from 25 to 44, 26.8% from 45 to 64, and 14.4% who were 65 years of age or older.  The median age was 40 years. For every 100 females, there were 92.7 males.  For every 100 females age 18 and over, there were 88.4 males.

The 2000 Census showed that median household income for the township was $73,989 and the median family income was $83,795. Males had a median income of $61,022 versus $37,011 for females. The per capita income for the township was $32,954.  About 1.7% of families and 2.3% of the population were below the poverty line, including 2.5% of those under age 18 and 2.9% of those age 65 or over.

Parks and recreation

Fishing is permitted on the reservoir.

Wall also has around 20 locations for outdoor activities including public parks, playgrounds, recreational sports fields, and other open outdoor spaces for hiking, cycling, fishing, and hunting. Parts of Allaire State Park and the Edgar Felix Bikeway are found in Wall Township.

Government

Local government 
Wall is governed under the Township form of New Jersey municipal government, one of 141 municipalities (of the 564) statewide that use this form, the second-most commonly used form of government in the state. It is the oldest form of government in New Jersey, having been first established in 1798, and enhanced by the Township Act of 1989. The Township Committee is comprised of five members, who are elected directly by the voters at-large in partisan elections to serve three-year terms of office on a staggered basis, with either one or two seats coming up for election each year as part of the November general election in a three-year cycle. Each year, at the annual reorganization meeting, the Township Committee selects one of its members to preside as mayor for the year, and another to serve as deputy mayor. It is the only form of government in which the mayor is not elected directly by the voters of the municipality. Wall is one of 11 Monmouth County municipalities that use the Township form of government.

, the members of the Wall Township Committee are Mayor Kevin P. Orender (R, term on committee and as mayor ends December 31, 2022), Deputy Mayor Daniel F. Becht (R, term on committee ends 2023; term as deputy mayor ends 2022), Timothy J. Farrell (R, 2024), Thomas M. Kingman (R, 2022) and Erin M. Mangan (R, 2023).

Jeffrey Foster resigned from his position on the Township Committee in July 2014 to seek a position with the township. Dominick DiRocco was appointed later that month to fill the vacant seat expiring in December 2016 and won election to serve the balance of the term of office.

Public safety

Law enforcement 
The Wall Township Police Department, consisting of approximately 68 sworn officers, provides primary law enforcement services for the township from their headquarters at 2700 Allaire Road.

Fire protection 
Wall Township is served by three fire districts. Wall Fire Company # 1 (52-1), the first volunteer fire company to serve the township, and known for years as the West Belmar Fire Company, was created in December 1909. Today this company remains all volunteer and serves the residents of the West Belmar section of town, also known as Wall Fire District #1. The headquarters station is located at 1511 18th Avenue, while the original 1910 fire station located at 1619 State Highway 71 is still in service as a satellite station. Glendola Fire Company (52-2), also known as Wall Fire District #2, was formed in May 1931. Their headquarters station is located at 3404 Belmar Boulevard. South Wall Fire-Rescue (52-3), protecting Wall Fire District #3, was established in 1946. Headquartered at 2605 Atlantic Avenue, South Wall responds to calls for service in the south end of town.

Fire inspection services for the entire township are provided by Wall Fire District #1 through the Fire Prevention Bureau. The fire marshal's office is located at 2700 Allaire Road.

Emergency medical services 
Wall Township is served by three first aid squads. Wall First Aid was formed in September 1939 and is known as Wall Township First Aid & Rescue Squad (52-21). Their station is located at 1900 Monmouth Boulevard, just off State Route 18. Wall Community First Aid Squad (52-22) was established on November 15, 1960. They operate from 1417 Lakewood Road, and primarily respond to the south end of the township. The Wall Township Police Department established a paid EMS squad (52-23) in 1999 to supplement the volunteer squads during the weekday daytime hours when they were prone to manpower shortages.  Wall EMS continues to be operated as part of the Wall Township Police Department.

Federal, state and county representation
Wall Township is located in the 4th Congressional District and is part of New Jersey's 30th state legislative district. Prior to the 2011 reapportionment following the 2010 Census, Wall Township had been in the 11th state legislative district.

 

Monmouth County is governed by a Board of County Commissioners comprised of five members who are elected at-large to serve three year terms of office on a staggered basis, with either one or two seats up for election each year as part of the November general election. At an annual reorganization meeting held in the beginning of January, the board selects one of its members to serve as Director and another as Deputy Director. , Monmouth County's Commissioners are
Commissioner Director Thomas A. Arnone (R, Neptune City, term as commissioner and as director ends December 31, 2022), 
Commissioner Deputy Director Susan M. Kiley (R, Hazlet Township, term as commissioner ends December 31, 2024; term as deputy commissioner director ends 2022),
Lillian G. Burry (R, Colts Neck Township, 2023),
Nick DiRocco (R, Wall Township, 2022), and 
Ross F. Licitra (R, Marlboro Township, 2023). 
Constitutional officers elected on a countywide basis are
County clerk Christine Giordano Hanlon (R, 2025; Ocean Township), 
Sheriff Shaun Golden (R, 2022; Howell Township) and 
Surrogate Rosemarie D. Peters (R, 2026; Middletown Township).

Politics
As of March 2011, there were a total of 18,809 registered voters in Wall Township, of which 3,256 (17.3%) were registered as Democrats, 6,373 (33.9%) were registered as Republicans and 9,171 (48.8%) were registered as Unaffiliated. There were 9 voters registered as Libertarians or Greens.

In the 2012 presidential election, Republican Mitt Romney received 63.4% of the vote (8,855 cast), ahead of Democrat Barack Obama with 35.5% (4,954 votes), and other candidates with 1.1% (158 votes), among the 14,062 ballots cast by the township's 19,604 registered voters (95 ballots were spoiled), for a turnout of 71.7%. In the 2008 presidential election, Republican John McCain received 60.7% of the vote (9,243 cast), ahead of Democrat Barack Obama with 36.9% (5,607 votes) and other candidates with 1.1% (172 votes), among the 15,215 ballots cast by the township's 19,601 registered voters, for a turnout of 77.6%. In the 2004 presidential election, Republican George W. Bush received 64.4% of the vote (9,434 ballots cast), outpolling Democrat John Kerry with 34.2% (5,013 votes) and other candidates with 0.7% (128 votes), among the 14,648 ballots cast by the township's 18,748 registered voters, for a turnout percentage of 78.1.

In the 2013 gubernatorial election, Republican Chris Christie received 76.7% of the vote (7,109 cast), ahead of Democrat Barbara Buono with 21.3% (1,977 votes), and other candidates with 1.9% (180 votes), among the 9,400 ballots cast by the township's 19,569 registered voters (134 ballots were spoiled), for a turnout of 48.0%. In the 2009 gubernatorial election, Republican Chris Christie received 70.0% of the vote (7,695 ballots cast), ahead of Democrat Jon Corzine with 23.1% (2,542 votes), Independent Chris Daggett with 5.5% (604 votes) and other candidates with 0.7% (81 votes), among the 10,994 ballots cast by the township's 19,085 registered voters, yielding a 57.6% turnout.

Education

The Wall Township Public Schools serve students in pre-kindergarten through twelfth grade. As of the 2020–21 school year, the district, comprised of seven schools, had an enrollment of 3,319 students and 377.1 classroom teachers (on an FTE basis), for a student–teacher ratio of 8.8:1. Schools in the district (with 2020–21 enrollment data from the National Center for Education Statistics) are 
Wall Primary School with 51 students in grades PreK, 
Allenwood Elementary School with 402 students in grades K-5, 
Central Elementary School with 495 students in grades K-5, 
Old Mill Elementary School with 357 students in grades K-5, 
West Belmar Elementary School with 116981 students in grades K-5, 
Wall Intermediate School with 777 students in grades 6–8 and 
Wall High School with 1,052 students in grades 9–12.

Infrastructure

Transportation

Roads and highways

A major transportation hub for Central Jersey, Wall Township is crisscrossed by several major highways that travel throughout the state.

Two major limited-access highways run through Wall Township: the Garden State Parkway (including interchange 98 for Belmar / Wall) and Interstate 195, which ends at Route 34 and continues as Route 138. Several state routes also pass through the township, including Route 18, which begins at a partial-cloverleaf interchange with Route 138, Route 33, Route 34 (with its southern terminus at the interchange of Routes 35 and 70), Route 35, Route 70 (which has its eastern terminus at Route 34 and continues towards the east as Route 35), and Route 71.

Major county roads that traverse through the township include CR 524 and CR 547.

Public transportation

Busing
Bus service is available from the Garden State Parkway to the Financial District in Lower Manhattan via the Academy Bus Line. Monmouth Park & Ride is located in the township off of the Garden State Parkway at mile marker 100. It is an express route to New York City during peak rush-hour.

NJ Transit bus service is available between the township and Philadelphia on the 317 route, with local service offered on the 830 and 836 routes.

Rail
NJ Transit offers train service on the North Jersey Coast Line at the Belmar, Spring Lake and Manasquan stations.

Aviation
Monmouth Executive Airport is located in the township (despite having a Farmingdale address), as it supplies short-distance flights for private jets to surrounding areas.

Healthcare
Jersey Shore University Medical Center (JSUMC) is a 691-bed non-profit, tertiary research and academic medical center located in neighboring Neptune Township. This major healthcare artery services the greater northern Jersey Shore region in Central Jersey. JSUMC is the shore region’s only university-level academic medical center, as it is a major partner of the Hackensack Meridian Healthcare network (it is the system's second largest hospital). JSUMC is also affiliated with the Robert Wood Johnson Medical School of Rutgers University, and Hackensack Meridian School of Medicine at Seton Hall University.

JSUMC is designated as a level II trauma center with a rooftop helipad handling medevac patients.

The medical complex also hosts the K. Hovnanian Children's Hospital, which treats infants, children, adolescents, and young adults up to the age of 21. JSUMC is a major teaching and tertiary care hospital that has a staff of 127 interns and residents, as a member of the Council of Teaching Hospitals and Health Systems.

Telecommunications

Wall Township is served by area codes 732 and 848 (for landlines and cell phones) and 908 (for cell phones). The township is a major landing point for multiple transatlantic subsea cables, including Havfrue AEC-2, Seaborn Networks' Seabras-1, and TGN Atlantic's TGN1 and TGN2.

Notable people

People who were born in, residents of, or otherwise closely associated with Wall Township include:

 James Peter Allaire (1785–1858), master mechanic and steam engine builder, and founder of Allaire Works (est. 1815), the first steam engine company in New York City, and later Howell Works
 James Avery, professional sous chef on season 11 of Hell's Kitchen
 Dara Brown (born ), news anchor and actress
 Kim Clijsters (born 1983), retired professional tennis player (and wife of Brian Lynch)
 George B. Cooper (1808–1866), politician who was elected to the United States House of Representatives in 1858, but left office after a year when Congress awarded the seat to his opponent in 1860
 Peter Criss (born 1945), musician with the band KISS
 Ashley Alexandra Dupré (born 1985 as Ashley Youmans), "high end call girl" whose dalliance with New York State Governor Eliot Spitzer led to his resignation
 Dean Ehehalt (born 1964), head coach of the Monmouth Hawks baseball team
 Theodore Fields, politician who served as a freeholder, and as sheriff of Monmouth County
 Fletcher (born 1994), singer-songwriter known for her single "Undrunk"
 George Gelnovatch (born 1965), men's head soccer coach, University of Virginia, and former professional soccer player
 Deborah Gramiccioni, attorney who worked in the administration of Governor Chris Christie and as the deputy executive director of the Port Authority of New York and New Jersey
 Emily Grove (born 1991), singer-songwriter and musician
 Suzy Hansen (born 1978), writer, whose book Notes on a Foreign Country: An American Abroad in a Post-America World was a finalist for the 2018 Pulitzer Prize for General Nonfiction
 Gary Hindley (born 1947), soccer coach
 Tom Kain (born 1963), 1984 U.S. Olympic Soccer Team, top-rated college player in the country at Duke University, four-time All American
 Sean T. Kean (born 1963), politician who represents the 30th legislative district in the New Jersey General Assembly, served on the Wall Township Planning Board from 2001 to 2002
 Brian Lynch (born 1978), retired professional basketball player and current coach (and husband of Kim Clijsters)
 Guglielmo Marconi (1874–1937), radio pioneer
 Gil McDougald (1928–2010), infielder who played for the New York Yankees
 Jessica Poland (born 1988), musician formerly signed to Geffen Records who performs under the stage name Charlotte Sometimes, who was a contestant on season 2 of The Voice
 Dan Prestup (born 1984), World's Fastest Drummer winner
 Dave Rible (born 1967), politician who has served in the New Jersey General Assembly since 2008
 Ed Sadowski (1917–1990), professional basketball player
 Athanasios Scheidt (born 1998), soccer player who plays as a midfielder for Polish club Radomiak Radom
 Rusty Schweickart (born 1935), astronaut
 Ned Thomson (born 1953), politician who has represented the 30th Legislative District in the New Jersey General Assembly since 2017
 F. Paul Wilson (born 1946), author
 Tim Wright (born 1990), football player for the Detroit Lions and Super Bowl XLIX champion

References

External links

Wall Township website
Wall Township Public Schools

School Data for the Wall Township Public Schools, National Center for Education Statistics
Wall Township Police Department
South Wall Fire-Rescue
Wall Fire Company #1
Wall Community First Aid Squad
Wall Township First Aid & Rescue Squad
www.infoage.org: Information on the former Marconi Wireless/Camp Evans site and the science center being established there.

 
1851 establishments in New Jersey
Populated places established in 1851
Township form of New Jersey government
Townships in Monmouth County, New Jersey